Aylwin is a 1920 British silent drama film directed by Henry Edwards and starring Henry Edwards, Chrissie White and Gerald Ames.  It is based on Theodore Watts-Dunton's 1898 novel of the same name.

Cast
 Henry Edwards - Hal Aylwin
 Chrissie White - Winifred Wynne
 Gerald Ames - Wilderspin
 Mary Dibley - Sinfi Lovell
 Henry Vibart - Philip Aylwin
 Gwynne Herbert - Mrs Aylwin
 Valentine Grace - Tom Wynne
 E.C. Matthews - Shales
 Amy Lorraine - Meg Gudgeon

References

External links

1920 films
British silent feature films
1920 drama films
Films directed by Henry Edwards
British drama films
British black-and-white films
Films based on British novels
Hepworth Pictures films
1920s English-language films
1920s British films
Silent drama films